A nitronate (IUPAC: azinate) in organic chemistry is a functional group with the general structure . It is the anion of nitronic acid (sometimes also called an aci, or  an azinic acid), a tautomeric form of a nitro compound. Just as ketones and aldehydes can exist in equilibrium with their enol tautomer, nitro compounds exist in equilibrium with their nitronate tautomer under basic conditions. In practice they are formed by the deprotonation of the α-carbon, the pka of which is typically around 17.

Nitronates are formed as intermediates in the Henry reaction and Nef reaction, the latter of which also demonstrates the instability of the nitronic acid form. The nitronate has two different resonance structures, one with a negative charge on the α-carbon and a double bond between the nitrogen and one of the oxygens, and another resonance structure with a double bond between the nitrogen and the α carbon, and no double bond between the nitrogen and the oxygens.

References 

Functional groups
Organonitrogen compounds
Anions